Marguerite de Béthune (1595 – 21 October 1660) was the daughter of Maximilien, Duke of Sully and his second wife Rachel de Cochefilet.

She married Henri de Rohan on 7 February 1603, and was then known as the Duchess consort of Rohan. Their only child Marguerite inherited the duchy and became Duchess of Rohan suo jure.

References

Sources

1595 births
1660 deaths
Marguerite